Ben Armour (born 17 April 1998) is a Scottish professional footballer who plays for Scottish League Two club side Forfar Athletic.

Club career
Born in Glasgow, Scotland, Armour started his career with Queen's Park

He then joined Morton's youth academy, before making his debut in April 2017 as a late substitute against Dunfermline Athletic.

Armour and goalkeeper Jamie McGowan signed a contract extension on 11 May 2017, for six months and one year respectively.

The young striker scored his first goal for the club coming on as a substitute on 1 July 2017; tapping in a rebound from close range in a pre-season friendly with Stenhousemuir.

Armour signed a one-year contract in June 2018. A month later, Armour scored his first goal for the club in a 5-0 home win against Albion Rovers in the Scottish League Cup group stage. He joined Scottish League One side Dumbarton on loan in January 2019, linking up with former manager Jim Duffy.

Armour left Morton in June 2019 and then signed a one-year contract with Peterhead.

He signed for Alloa Athletic in June 2021.

In June 2022, Armour signed with Scottish League Two side Forfar Athletic on a one-year deal.

Career statistics

References

External links

1998 births
Annan Athletic F.C. players
Association football forwards
Greenock Morton F.C. players
Living people
Queen's Park F.C. players
Scottish footballers
Scottish Professional Football League players
Footballers from Glasgow
Dumbarton F.C. players
Peterhead F.C. players
Alloa Athletic F.C. players
Forfar Athletic F.C. players